HNLMS Utrecht was a  protected cruiser of the Royal Netherlands Navy.

Design
Two  single turret guns provided the ship's main armament, and these were augmented by six single  guns and four  single guns. The ship had a complement of 324 men.

Service history
The ship was built at the Rijkswerf in Amsterdam and launched on 14 July 1898. The ship was commissioned on 1 March 1901. On 6 May that year  Utrecht made a trip with adelborsten to the Mediterranean Sea. The ports of Cádiz, La Spezia, Naples and Toulon were visited. On 22 July, the ship arrived in the port of Flushing concluding the trip.

Prior to their arrival, the Venezuelan Navy had repeatedly checked Dutch and Antillean merchant ships and the presence of the Dutch warships acted as a deterrent against further actions.

On 6 July 1904, Utrecht and  both ran aground near Aroes Lampoejang, South Sumatra because of incomplete maps. The ships where repaired in respectively Surabaya and Singapore. Later that year on 18 September, Utrecht assisted Van Outshoorn of the Koninklijke Paketvaart Maatschappij that had hit a cliff.

On 17 June 1905, Utrecht and her sisters  and Gelderland returned to the Netherlands. The journey took them to Tanjung Priok, Mahé, Perim, Port Said, Algiers and Tangier before they arriving on 30 August at Den Helder.

On 1 September 1909, Utrecht left Suriname for a visit to New York City. The ship was there to participate in the Hudson–Fulton Celebration, held in honor of the arrival of Henry Hudson in America on the ship Halve Maen of the Dutch East India Company and the launch of a Robert Fulton designed steamship in 1809. The ship participated in a fleet review on the Hudson River. During this review the crew of Utrecht dressed in seventeenth century costumes  and sailed on a replica of Hudson's ship Halve Maen that was built by the Rijkswerf in Amsterdam. The replica was later offered to the chairman of the committee of the feasts. However the replica was destroyed in a fire shortly after.

25 April 1910, the ship left Paramaribo for a trip to Buenos Aires for the celebration of 100 years independence of Argentina. On 21 May, that year she participated in a fleet review held there. On 2 July, Utrecht started on the journey back with stops in Brazil and Grenada. On 26 August, the ship was back in Suriname.

The ships was decommissioned in 1913.

Notes

References

Staatsbegrooting voor het dienstjaar 1903 (2. VI. 5.)

Holland-class cruisers
1898 ships